Hamirbati is a village in the Arambagh CD block  in the Arambagh subdivision of Hooghly district in the Indian state of West Bengal.

Geography

Location
Hamirbati is located at

Area overview
The Arambagh subdivision, presented in the map alongside, is divided into two physiographic parts – the Dwarakeswar River being the dividing line. The western part is upland and rocky – it is extension of the terrain of neighbouring Bankura district. The eastern part is flat alluvial plain area.  The railways, the roads and flood-control measures have had an impact on the area. The area is overwhelmingly rural with 94.77% of the population living in rural areas and 5.23% of the population living in urban areas.

Note: The map alongside presents some of the notable locations in the subdivision. All places marked in the map are linked in the larger full screen map.

Demographics
As per the 2011 Census of India, Hamirbati had a total population of 1,754 of which 895 (51%) were males and 859 (49%) were females. Population in the age range 0–6 years was 225. The total number of literate persons in Hamirbati was 1,202 (78.61% of the population over 6 years).

Hamirbati picture gallery

References

External links

Villages in Hooghly district